Baliyan is an Indian surname. Notable people with the surname include:

 Naresh Balyan, Indian politician
 Naresh Kumar Baliyan Former MP Muzaffarnagar Lok Sabha
 Sanjeev Balyan, Indian politician
 Gourav Baliyan, Indian wrestler
 Vidisha Baliyan, Indian deaf model and Miss Deaf World 2019
 Mahendra Singh Tikait, Indian farmer leader
 Rakesh Tikait, National spokesperson of BKU

Surnames of Indian origin